Om Prakash Chautala (born 1 January 1935) is an Indian politician from Haryana who served as a former Chief Minister of Haryana from Indian National Lok Dal and son of 6th Deputy Prime Minister Chaudhary Devi Lal.

Biography 
Chautala is the son of Devi Lal, a former Deputy Prime Minister of India. He was married to Sneh Lata, who died in August 2019. He was born in a Jat family of Sihag clan. He has two sons, Ajay Singh Chautala and Abhay Singh Chautala, and three daughters. Abhay is MLA from Ellenabad  also remained Leader of Opposition, Haryana Legislative Assembly from October 2014 - March 2019, 10th President of Indian Olympic Association and his grandson Dushyant Chautala is a Deputy Chief Minister of Haryana from Uchana, Jind Seat of Haryana Vidhan Sabha and former MP from Hisar Lok Sabha Seat. He was the Chief Minister of Haryana from 2 December 1989 to 22 May 1990, from 12 July 1990 to 17 July 1990, again from 22 March 1991 to 6 April 1991 and, finally, from 24 July 1999 to 5 March 2005. Politically, he had been part of NDA and Third Front (non-NDA & non-UPA front) at national level.

Chautala was released from the Tihar Jail on 2 July 2021 after serving nine and a half years of a 10-year prison sentence. His early release was due to a decision of the Delhi government to reduce prison populations to manage the COVID-19 pandemic.

Recruitment scam 

In June 2008 OP Chautala and 53 others were charged in connection with the appointment of 3,206 junior basic teachers in the state of Haryana during 1999–2000. In January 2013 a New Delhi court sentenced Chautala and his son Ajay Singh Chautala to ten years' imprisonment under various provisions of the IPC and the Prevention of Corruption Act. Chautala was found guilty of illegally recruiting over 3,000 unqualified teachers. A CBI investigation was ordered by the Supreme Court based on a writ filed by the former director of primary education Sanjeev Kumar, a 1989 batch IAS officer.

His sentence has been upheld by the Delhi High Court and the Supreme Court.

Disproportionate assets case  
Chautala was awarded a four-year jail term in a 16 years old disproportionate assets case on 27 May 2022 by CBI Court. Along with the jail-time, the Delhi CBI Court also imposed a fine . In the process, Chautala became the oldest prisoner of the Tihar Jail of Delhi at age of 87.

See also 

 Political families of Haryana

References

External links 
 Official website of Indian National Lok Dal

1935 births
Living people
People from Sirsa district
Chief Ministers of Haryana
Indian National Lok Dal politicians
Leaders of the Opposition in Haryana
Haryana MLAs 2009–2014
Om Prakash
Chief ministers from Janata Dal
Janata Dal politicians
Samajwadi Janata Party politicians